John Charles Reiss (May 13, 1922 – March 4, 2012)  was an American prelate of the Roman Catholic Church. He served as bishop of the Diocese of Trenton in New Jersey from 1980 to 1997.  He previously served as an auxiliary bishop of the same diocese from 1967 to 1980.

Biography

Early life 
John Reiss was born on May 12, 1922, in Red Bank, New Jersey.  He studied for the priesthood at the Catholic University of America in Washington, D.C., and at Immaculate Conception Seminary in Darlington, New Jersey. 

Reiss was ordained to the priesthood for the Diocese of Trenton by Bishop William A. Griffin May 31, 1947. After serving as an associate pastor, he became master of ceremonies and secretary to Bishop George W. Ahr in 1953.

In 1954, Reiss earned a doctorate in canon law from the Catholic University School of Canon Law. for his thesis entitled The Time and Place of Sacred Ordination: A Historical Synopsis and a Commentary, which was subsequently published by the Catholic University of America Press. Following his return to Trenton, Reiss served as assistant chancellor, vice chancellor, and official of the Diocesan Tribunal. He was named a domestic prelate in October 1963, and pastor of St. Francis Parish in Trenton in 1965.

Auxiliary Bishop and Bishop of Trenton 
On October 21, 1967, Reiss was appointed auxiliary bishop of the Diocese of Trenton and Titular Bishop of Simidicca by Pope Paul VI. He received his episcopal consecration on December 12, 1967, from Bishop Ahr, with Bishops Walter W. Curtis and James J. Hogan serving as co-consecrators. 

Reiss was later named the eighth bishop of Trenton by Pope John Paul II on March 11, 1980, and was installed on April 22, 1980.. He was the first native son of the Trenton Diocese to become its ordinary.

Reiss presided at the centennial of the Diocese in August 1981. In November 1981, the Diocese was divided and the Diocese of Metuchen was established to serve the Catholics of Middlesex, Somerset, Hunterdon, and Warren counties. During his tenure as bishop, Reiss established the Emmaus program of priestly spirituality in 1982; implemented Renew, a process of lay spiritual renewal, between 1985 and 1987; held the Fourth Diocesan Synod (the first in 60 years) from January to December 1991; raised $38 million between 1992 and 1995 to provide financial stability for diocesan services through Faith-In-Service, a diocesan capital and endowment fund campaign; dedicated a new Morris Hall, with St. Joseph Hall Skilled Nursing Center and St. Mary Hall Residence, in 1994; dedicated Villa Vianney, a residence for retired priests, in 1995; and completed a new Diocesan Pastoral Center, tripling the size of the diocesan office building, in 1997.

On June 30, 1997, John Paul II accepted Reiss' resignation as bishop of the Diocese of Trenton. He was succeeded by John Mortimer Smith. John Reiss died on March 4, 2012, at age 89 in Lawrenceville, New Jersey.

References

1922 births
2012 deaths
Catholic University of America alumni
Seton Hall University alumni
People from Red Bank, New Jersey
20th-century Roman Catholic bishops in the United States
Roman Catholic bishops of Trenton
Catholic University of America School of Canon Law alumni